Anthony N. "Tony" Lawrence III (born April 3, 1965) is an American judge on the Mississippi Court of Appeals.

References

External links 
 
 

1965 births
21st-century American judges
21st-century American lawyers
American prosecutors
District attorneys in Mississippi
Living people
Mississippi Court of Appeals judges
People from Pascagoula, Mississippi
University of Mississippi School of Law alumni
University of Southern Mississippi alumni